Wica or WICA may refer to:

 Wicca, a contemporary pagan and new religious movement
 Seax-Wica, a tradition, or denomination, of the neopagan religion of Wicca 
 Witches International Craft Association, established by Leo Martello in 1970
 Witchcraft Information Centre & Archive, established by Dr Leo Ruickbie in 1999
 WICA (FM), a radio station (91.5 FM) licensed to serve Traverse City, Michigan, United States
 WICA-TV, a defunct television station (channel 15) formerly licensed to serve Ashtabula, Ohio, United States, which existed from 1953 to 1956, and again from 1965 to 1967
 West Indian Court of Appeal
 WICA, ICAO code for Kertajati International Airport